Kim Sa-rang (born December 3, 1981) is a South Korean rock singer-songwriter.

Biography 
Kim debuted in 1999 with his first album, I Am 18 Years Old, on which he single-handedly took care of the composition, lyrics, arrangement, and instrumentals. After his second album in 2001, Kim retreated from the public eye, though he continued to work in music production and perform the occasional live gigs. Kim returned in 2007 with the release of his third album, U Turn. The album features ten new songs, mostly leaning towards band sound with a relaxing mood, simple guitar arrangements, and emotionally honest lyrics.

On September 1, 2009, Kim Sa-rang released his EP Behind the Melody with a total of five songs. Singer Kim Sa-rang performed at the concert Return at the beginning of 2017.

Discography

Studio albums

EPs

Digital singles

Awards

References

External links 
 

South Korean pop rock singers
South Korean rock guitarists
Indie rock musicians
South Korean record producers
1981 births
Living people
21st-century South Korean  male singers
21st-century guitarists
South Korean male singer-songwriters